Black Noon is a 1971 American Horror Western television film. It was written and produced by Andrew J. Fenady and directed by Bernard L. Kowalski. The film originally aired on November 5, 1971, as part of CBS's The CBS Friday Night Movies, and was shown repeatedly in 1982.

Plot

When Reverend John Keyes (Roy Thinnes) and his wife Lorna (Lynn Loring) arrive in a western town, they find that there is mysterious force causing bad luck to plague the settlers. Once the Reverend is able to get the recalcitrant residents to speak about the ongoing troubles, he finds his spiritual leadership is being challenged by a cult of devil worshippers who practice voodoo, and have to get to the heart of a strange relationship between a mute young girl and a gunslinger who seem possessed by Satanic spirits.

Cast
 Roy Thinnes as Reverend John Keyes 
 Yvette Mimieux as Deliverance 
 Ray Milland as Caleb Hobbs 
 Gloria Grahame as Bethia 
 Lynn Loring as Lorna Keyes (as Lyn Loring)
 Henry Silva as Noon 
 Hank Worden as Joseph 
 William Bryant as Jacob (as Bill Bryant)
 Stan Barrett as Man in Mirror 
 Joshua Bryant as Towhead 
 Jennifer Bryant as Towhead
 Charles McCready as Towhead
 Leif Garrett as Towhead
 David S. Cass Sr. as Man (as Dave Cass)
 Suzan Sheppard as Wife 
 Bobby Eilbacher as Boy 
 Buddy Foster as Ethan

Reception

Jerry Beigel wrote in the Los Angeles Times about the premiere stating that the film's release would have been more fitting a week earlier, before Halloween.

See also
 List of American films of 1971

References

External links
 
 
 
 

1971 television films
American horror television films
American Western (genre) television films
1970s mystery films
1970s supernatural horror films
American mystery films
American supernatural horror films
CBS network films
Films about Voodoo
Films about cults
Films directed by Bernard L. Kowalski
Films scored by George Duning
Films shot in California
1970s English-language films
1970s American films
1970s Western (genre) horror films